Timber Trades Journal is a UK trade magazine for the timber industry, published by Progressive Media Publishing. It was first published in 1873 and has been recognised as the leading journal for the timber industry.

Timber Trades Journal's annual TTJ Awards have been running for 13 years, and are held in association with UK timber industry trade association TRADA.

References

External links 
 Timber Trades Journal

Business magazines published in the United Kingdom
Professional and trade magazines
Magazines established in 1873
Forestry in the United Kingdom